Wesley Wales Anderson (born May 1, 1969) is an American filmmaker. His films are known for their eccentricity and unique visual and narrative styles. They often contain themes of grief, loss of innocence, and dysfunctional families. Cited by some critics as a modern-day example of the work of an auteur, three of Anderson's films have appeared in BBC Culture's 2016 poll of the greatest films since 2000.

He gained acclaim for his early work Bottle Rocket (1996), and Rushmore (1998). During this time, he often collaborated with Luke Wilson and Owen Wilson and founded his production company American Empirical Pictures, which he currently runs. He then received a nomination for the Academy Award for Best Original Screenplay for The Royal Tenenbaums (2001). His next films included The Life Aquatic with Steve Zissou (2004), The Darjeeling Limited (2007), and his first stop-motion film Fantastic Mr. Fox (2009) for which he received an Academy Award for Best Animated Feature nomination, and then  Moonrise Kingdom (2012) earning his second Academy Award for Best Original Screenplay nomination. 

With Anderson's film The Grand Budapest Hotel (2014), he received his first Academy Award nominations for Best Director and Best Picture, and won the Golden Globe Award for Best Motion Picture – Musical or Comedy and the BAFTA Award for Best Original Screenplay. The next films included his second stop-motion film Isle of Dogs (2018), which earned him the Silver Bear for Best Director, and The French Dispatch (2021).

Early life 
Wesley Wales Anderson was born on May 1, 1969, in Houston, Texas, to Texas Ann Anderson (née Burroughs), a realtor and archaeologist, and Melver Leonard Anderson, who worked in advertising and public relations. He is the second of three boys; his parents divorced when he was eight. His older brother, Mel, is a physician, and his younger brother, Eric Chase Anderson, is a writer and artist whose paintings and designs have appeared in several of Anderson's films, such as The Royal Tenenbaums. Anderson is of English, Swedish and Norwegian ancestry.

He graduated from St. John's School in Houston in 1987, which he later used as a prominent location throughout Rushmore. As a child, Anderson made silent films on his father's Super 8 camera which starred his brothers and friends, although his first ambition was to be a writer. Anderson worked part-time as a cinema projectionist while attending the University of Texas at Austin, where he met his roommate and future collaborator Owen Wilson in 1989. In 1991, he graduated with a Bachelor of Arts with a major in philosophy.

Film career

1990s 
Anderson's first film was Bottle Rocket (1996), based on a short film of the same name that he made with Luke and Owen Wilson. It was a crime caper about a group of young Texans aspiring to achieve major heists. It was well reviewed but performed poorly at the box office.

His next film was Rushmore (1998), a quirky comedy about a high school student's crush on an elementary school teacher starring Jason Schwartzman, Bill Murray, and Olivia Williams. It was a critical and financial  success. The film launched Murray's second act as a respected actor within independent cinema. Murray has since appeared in every Anderson film to date. At the 1999 Independent Spirit Awards, Anderson won the Best Director award and Murray won Best Supporting Male. Murray also earned a nomination for Golden Globe Award for Best Supporting Actor – Motion Picture. In 2000, filmmaker Martin Scorsese praised Bottle Rocket and Rushmore. Since its release, Rushmore has gained cult status, and in 2016, the film was selected for preservation in the United States National Film Registry by the Library of Congress as being deemed "culturally, historically, or aesthetically significant".

2000s 

Anderson's next comedy-drama, The Royal Tenenbaums, was released in 2001. The film focuses on a successful and artistic New York City family and its ostracized patriarch played by Gene Hackman. The film also starred Anjelica Huston as the ex-wife and Ben Stiller, Luke Wilson, and Gwyneth Paltrow as the children. The film was a box-office and critical success. It represented his greatest financial success until Moonrise Kingdom in 2012, earning more than $50 million in domestic box-office receipts. The Royal Tenenbaums was nominated for an Academy Award and ranked by an Empire poll as the 159th greatest film ever made.

Anderson's next feature was The Life Aquatic with Steve Zissou (2004) about a Jacques Cousteau-esque documentary filmmaker played by Bill Murray. The film also starred Owen Wilson, Cate Blanchett, Willem Dafoe, Jeff Goldblum, Anjelica Huston, and Michael Gambon. The film serves as a classic example of Anderson's style, but its critical reception was less favorable than his previous films, and its box office did not match the heights of The Royal Tenenbaums. In September 2006, Steely Dan's Walter Becker and Donald Fagen released a tongue-in-cheek "letter of intervention" for Anderson's artistic "malaise" following the disappointing commercial and critical reception of The Life Aquatic with Steve Zissou, proclaiming themselves to be fans of World Cinema and of Anderson in particular. They offered Anderson their soundtrack services for  The Darjeeling Limited, including lyrics for a title track.

The Darjeeling Limited (2007) was about three emotionally distant brothers traveling together on a train in India. It reflected the more dramatic tone of The Royal Tenenbaums but faced criticisms similar to The Life Aquatic with Steve Zissou. Anderson has acknowledged that he went to India to film the movie partly as a tribute to Indian filmmaker Satyajit Ray, whose "films have also inspired all my other movies in different ways" (the film is dedicated to him). The film starred Anderson staples Jason Schwartzman and Owen Wilson in addition to Adrien Brody, and the script was co-written by Anderson, Schwartzman, and Roman Coppola.

Anderson has also made several notable short films. In addition to the original Bottle Rocket short, he made the Paris-set Hotel Chevalier (2007), which was created as a prologue to The Darjeeling Limited and starred Jason Schwartzman alongside Natalie Portman, and the Italy-set Castello Cavalcanti (2013), which was produced by Prada and starred Jason Schwartzman as an unsuccessful race-car driver. Additionally, he has directed a number of television commercials for companies such as Stella Artois and Prada, including an elaborate American Express ad, in which he starred as himself. Anderson wrote a script for Brian Glazer for an English-language remake of Patrice Leconte's My Best Friend. In 2010 he said that he did not plan to direct the film, tentatively called The Rosenthaler Suite.

In 2009, Anderson's stop-motion-animated film adaptation based on the Roald Dahl book Fantastic Mr Fox was released. Voice talents included George Clooney, Meryl Streep, Owen Wilson, Bill Murray, Willem Dafoe, Jason Schwartzman, Adrien Brody, and Michael Gambon. The film was highly praised among critics and nominated for the Academy Award for Best Animated Feature, although it barely made back its production budget.

2010s 

In 2012, Anderson's film Moonrise Kingdom was released, debuting at the Cannes Film Festival, where it competed for the Palme d'Or. The film is a coming-of-age comedy set in a fictional New England town. The film includes ensemble performances from Bill Murray, Edward Norton, Bruce Willis, Frances McDormand, and Tilda Swinton. The film was emblematic of Anderson's style and earned Anderson another Academy Award nomination for his screenplay. The film was also a financial success, earning $68.3 million at the box office against a budget of only $16 million.

In 2014, Anderson's next film, The Grand Budapest Hotel, was released and starred Ralph Fiennes, Tony Revolori, Saoirse Ronan, Jeff Goldblum, Willem Dafoe, F. Murray Abraham, as well as several of his regular collaborators, including Bill Murray, Owen Wilson, Tilda Swinton and Jason Schwartzman. It is mostly set in the 1930s and follows the adventures of M. Gustave, the hotel's concierge, making "a marvelous mockery of history, turning its horrors into a series of graceful jokes and mischievous gestures," according to The New York Times. The film represented one of Anderson's greatest critical and commercial successes, grossing nearly $175 million worldwide and earning dozens of award nominations, including nine Oscar nominations with four wins for Best Production Design, Best Costume Design, Best Makeup, and Best Original Score. These nominations also included his first for Best Director.

Anderson returned to stop-motion animation with Isle of Dogs. Production on the film started in the United Kingdom in October 2016, and it was released in March–April 2018. The film received Academy Award nominations for Best Animated Feature and Best Original Score.

2020s
Anderson's latest film, The French Dispatch, is set in post-war France and stars Benicio Del Toro, Jeffrey Wright, Bill Murray, Frances McDormand, Owen Wilson, Willem Dafoe, Adrien Brody, Tilda Swinton and Timothée Chalamet. Its release was delayed due to the COVID-19 pandemic, finally premiering at the Cannes Film Festival on July 12, 2021, with a general release in the United States on October 22, 2021. In the meantime, Searchlight Pictures released in September 2021 an animated music video of Christophe's "Aline" covered by Jarvis Cocker, directed by Anderson with animations by Javi Aznarez.

 Upcoming projects 

In November 2021, Anderson finished filming his latest feature entitled Asteroid City, but very few details have transpired to the press. In May 2021 it was announced that it would be filmed in the Spanish city of Chinchón, where a huge diorama set reproducing Monument Valley were under construction. The film stars Tom Hanks, Margot Robbie, Scarlett Johansson, Adrien Brody, Tilda Swinton, Bryan Cranston, Jeff Goldblum, Hope Davis, and Jeffrey Wright among many others.

In January 2022, it was announced that Anderson would direct an adaptation of Roald Dahl's short story collection The Wonderful Story of Henry Sugar and Six More for Netflix, which holds the rights to Dahl's works, with Benedict Cumberbatch, Dev Patel, Ralph Fiennes, and Ben Kingsley set to star.

Directing techniques 

Anderson's cinematic influences include Pedro Almodóvar, Satyajit Ray, Hal Ashby, and Roman Polanski. Anderson has a unique directorial style that has led several critics to consider him an auteur. Wes Anderson is considered a central figure in the American Eccentric Cinema tradition.

Themes and stories 
Anderson has chosen to direct mostly fast-paced comedies marked by more serious or melancholic elements, with themes often centered on grief, loss of innocence, dysfunctional families, parental abandonment, adultery, sibling rivalry and unlikely friendships. His movies have been noted for being unusually character-driven and by turns both derided and praised with terms like "literary geek chic". The plots of his movies often feature thefts and unexpected disappearances, with a tendency to borrow liberally from the caper genre.

Visual style 
Anderson has been noted for extensive use of flat space camera moves, symmetrical compositions, knolling, snap-zooms, slow-motion walking shots, a deliberately limited color palette, and handmade art direction often utilizing miniatures. These stylistic choices give his movies a highly distinctive quality that has provoked much discussion, critical study, supercuts, mash-ups, and parody. Many writers, critics, and even Anderson himself, have commented that this gives his movies the feel of being "self-contained worlds," or a "scale model household". According to Jesse Fox Mayshark, his films have "a baroque pop bent that is not realist, surrealist or magic realist," but rather might be described as "fabul[ist]". In 2019, the company Murals Wallpaper from the UK launched a line of wallpapers inspired by the visual design of Anderson's films.

From The Life Aquatic with Steve Zissou on, Anderson has relied more heavily on stop motion animation and miniatures, even making entire features with stop motion animation with Fantastic Mr. Fox and Isle of Dogs.

Soundtracks 
Anderson frequently uses pop music from the 1960s and '70s on the soundtracks of his films, and one band or musician tends to dominate each soundtrack. Rushmore prominently featured Cat Stevens and British Invasion groups; The Royal Tenenbaums featured Nico; The Life Aquatic with Steve Zissou, David Bowie, including both originals and covers performed by Seu Jorge; The Darjeeling Limited and Rushmore, the Kinks; Fantastic Mr. Fox, the Beach Boys; and Moonrise Kingdom, Hank Williams. (Much of Moonrise Kingdom is filled with the music of Benjamin Britten, which is tied to a number of major plot points for that film.) The Darjeeling Limited also borrowed music styles from Satyajit Ray's films. The Grand Budapest Hotel, which is mostly set in the 1930s, is notable for being the first Anderson film to eschew using any pop music, and instead used original music composed by Alexandre Desplat. Its soundtrack won Desplat the Academy Award for Best Original Score, the BAFTA Award for Best Film Music, and World Soundtrack Award for Best Original Score of the Year. The soundtracks for his films have often brought renewed attention to the artists featured, most prominently in the case of "These Days", which was used in The Royal Tenenbaums.

Postmodern film 
Anderson's work has been classified as postmodern, on account of his nostalgic attention to detail, his subversion of mainstream conventions of narrative, his references to different genres in the same film, and his love for eccentric characters with complex sexual identities.

Personal life 
Anderson is in a romantic relationship with Lebanese writer, costume designer, and voice actress Juman Malouf, who is the daughter of novelist Hanan al-Shaykh. Malouf gave birth to the couple's daughter, Freya, in 2016. She is named after a character from the film The Mortal Storm.

Anderson currently lives in Paris but spent most of his adult life in New York City. He is the brother of author, illustrator and actor Eric Chase Anderson, who illustrated the Criterion Collection releases of some of Anderson's films (Rushmore, The Royal Tenenbaums, The Life Aquatic with Steve Zissou and The Darjeeling Limited) and provided the voice of Kristofferson Silverfox in Fantastic Mr. Fox.

In popular culture  
Anderson's distinctive filmmaking style has led to numerous homages and parodies. Notable examples include:
In 2011, Italian indie pop band I Cani released a song titled Wes Anderson, with lyrics alluding to the tropes present in Anderson's movies.
In 2013, Saturday Night Live did a parody of Wes Anderson's take on a horror film with a film trailer for the fictional The Midnight Coterie of Sinister Intruders. The trailer starred Edward Norton as Owen Wilson, Noel Wells as Gwyneth Paltrow, Kate McKinnon as Tilda Swinton, and Alec Baldwin as the narrator. 
In 2015, the film-dedicated YouTube channel Patrick (H) Willems made a  parody video titled What if Wes Anderson Directed X-Men?. The video has 4 million views. 
In 2015, Anderson designed the interior for Bar Luce, a café located in Fondazione Prada in Milan.
In November 2017, Family Guy aired its Season 16 episode titled Three Directors, about Peter Griffin's firing from his job at the brewery, as told in the idiosyncratic styles of directors Quentin Tarantino, Wes Anderson, and Michael Bay. 
A package in the popular programming language R was named after Wes Anderson. It features several palettes derived from the Tumblr blog "Wes Anderson Palettes", which creates appealing color palettes inspired by frames of Anderson's movies.
A book titled Accidentally Wes Anderson, based on the popular Instagram account, was published in October 2020. The book features photographs of locations and people which fit the aesthetic of Wes Anderson's films.
In January 2021, The Simpsons aired its Season 32 episode titled The Dad-Feelings Limited. The title of the episode references Wes Anderson's 2007 film The Darjeeling Limited. The episode itself tells the origin story of the Simpsons character Comic Book Guy and refers to several Wes Anderson styles and tropes, including a Royal Tenenbaums-esque chronicling of the character’s elaborate family tree.

Filmography

Awards and nominations

Recurring collaborators 

Anderson's films feature many recurring actors, including the Wilson brothers (Owen, Luke, and Andrew), Bill Murray, Jason Schwartzman, Anjelica Huston, Willem Dafoe, Jeff Goldblum, Edward Norton, Adrien Brody, Bob Balaban, and Tilda Swinton. Robert Yeoman has served as director of photography for all of Anderson's live-action films, while Mark Mothersbaugh composed Anderson's first four films, with Alexandre Desplat with six films, taking over composing since Fantastic Mr. Fox.  Randall Poster has served as music supervisor for all of Anderson's films since Rushmore. Anderson has frequently co-written his films alongside various writers including Owen Wilson, Jason Schwartzman, Noah Baumbach, Roman Coppola, and Hugo Guinness.

Other projects 
Wes Anderson designed a carriage for the Belmond’s British Pullman train, which  began  running on October 13, 2021.

References

Further reading

External links 

 
 
 Wes Anderson at Unsung Films
 "Into The Deep", in-depth Anderson profile at The Guardian February 12, 2005
 "Wes Anderson", a brief profile by Martin Scorsese in Esquire.

1969 births
American animated film directors
American animated film producers
American expatriates in France
American people of English descent
American people of Norwegian descent
American people of Swedish descent
Film producers from Texas
American male screenwriters
Film directors from Texas
Living people
Writers from Austin, Texas
Writers from Houston
Animators from Texas
Male actors from Houston
University of Texas at Austin College of Liberal Arts alumni
TSTV alumni
Animation screenwriters
Annie Award winners
Independent Spirit Award for Best Director winners
Stop motion animators
Golden Globe Award-winning producers
Best Original Screenplay BAFTA Award winners
Writers Guild of America Award winners
Screenwriters from Texas
Silver Bear for Best Director recipients
St. John's School (Texas) alumni
Postmodernist filmmakers
Culture of Houston
Cinephiles